The Duida grass finch (Emberizoides duidae) is a species of bird in the family Thraupidae.

It is endemic to Cerro Duida, a mountain in Venezuela, and is known only from specimens collected in 1928 and 1929. The population is nevertheless believed to be stable because of the remoteness of its range. Its natural habitat is dry savanna.

References

Emberizoides
Endemic birds of Venezuela
Birds described in 1929
Taxonomy articles created by Polbot